Darryl Roach is an English-born Montserratian footballer who has previously played as a midfielder for Port Melbourne Sharks, and has been capped internationally for the Montserrat national football team.

Career

Club career
Roach played for Watford's youth team, and Milton Keynes Dons in the 2003–04 season, before having a trial at Aldershot Town in July 2004. Aldershot manager, Terry Brown commented on Roach's performance in a friendly against Maidenhead United; "I think Darryl did well, to be fair the boy's hardly trained and we've come in and put him into two games. He's got talent and you can see that but he doesn't look anywhere near as fit as he should be but that's understandable."

In January 2005, he went on to spend time at Notts County on trial, playing for their reserve team. Roach then joined Southern League Division One East club Tilbury in February 2005, before later moving onto Wingate & Finchley in March 2005.

Roach went on to join Australian club Port Melbourne Sharks in 2011 where he won the club's player of the season in 2013

In 2015 Roach joined State League 3 North-West side Williamstown SC, alongside his Montserrat teammate Jay'lee Hodgson where he scored 8 goals in 15 appearances.

In 2017, Darryl signed for Sunshine George Cross, where he made 1 appearance in the senior team and 6 appearances in the Under 20 set-up before moving to State League 2 North-West team Hoppers Crossing SC in June and relegated the following year.

International career
Roach qualifies to play for Montserrat national football team through his mother, who was born on the island. He was called up to the senior squad in 2011, for their 2014 FIFA World Cup CONCACAF First Round qualifiers against Belize. He made his debut against Belize on 15 June, in their home fixture, which was played at Ato Boldon Stadium in Couva, Trinidad and Tobago. Montserrat lost 5–2. He played again in the away tie which was at held at Estadio Olímpico Metropolitano in San Pedro Sula, Honduras, but could not prevent Montserrat losing 3–1 and overall 8–3 on aggregate.

Personal life
Roach was born in England, and his grandmother was born in the Caribbean island of Montserrat. He moved to Australia, where he married a local woman.

References

1984 births
Living people
Montserrat international footballers
Montserratian footballers
Victorian Premier League players
Isthmian League players
Tilbury F.C. players
Wingate & Finchley F.C. players
Port Melbourne SC players
South Springvale SC players
FC Clifton Hill players
Caroline Springs George Cross FC players
Association football midfielders
Association football forwards
Hoppers Crossing Soccer Club players